Yáng Wéizhēn (Yang Wei-chen, traditional: 楊維楨, simplified: 杨维桢); ca. (1296 – 1370) was a Chinese painter and calligrapher during the Yuan Dynasty (1271–1368).

Yang was born in the Zhejiang province. His style name was 'Lianfu' and his sobriquet was 'Tieya'. Yang's reputation for calligraphy was well known, incorporating a purity and strength into his works.

References 

1296 births
1370 deaths
Yuan dynasty painters
Ming dynasty painters
Yuan dynasty calligraphers
Yuan dynasty historians
Ming dynasty historians
Painters from Zhejiang
Writers from Shaoxing
Yuan dynasty politicians
Ming dynasty politicians
Politicians from Shaoxing
Historians from Zhejiang
14th-century Chinese calligraphers
14th-century Chinese historians
14th-century Chinese musicians